A naval offensive is the aggressive deployment of naval forces during a military campaign to strategically, operationally or tactically provide secure use of shipping routes, or coastal regions for friendly shipping, or deny them to enemy shipping.

The aim of a naval offensive is usually in "exerting specific superiority at the point of impact", and has been considered the best strategy in Europe against a threat of invasion since the Middle Ages.

A naval offensive may include use of surface or submarine combat vessels, or both as at the Battle of Heligoland Bight, and aircraft carrier or shore-based fixed-wing and helicopter aircraft and amphibious assault troops to conduct the offensive as a means of "projection of naval power against land objectives", or support one by transporting troops.

The scale of a naval offensive need not be a massive ocean fleet operation, but may be conducted with relatively few and light forces on lakes.

In the naval history the earliest naval offensives in the record of military history were the Punic Wars between Rome and Carthage for the domination of the Mediterranean regional trade, while coastal offensives date to the earlier raids of the Sea Peoples. At least one naval offensive is claimed to have changed the course of history in Europe.

The conduct of naval offensives may require construction of naval bases to support offensive action in the area, particularly in the case of submarines. One example is the Bay of Kotor base used by the Austro-Hungarian forces in the Adriatic Sea during the First World War.

A naval offensive may be active involving direct combat between units, or passive, involving use of sea route and operational area mining.

See also

Battle of the Atlantic (1914–1918)
Battle of Gallipoli
Battle of the Atlantic (1939–1945)
Arctic Convoys
Battle of the Mediterranean
Battle of the Indian Ocean
Battle of Pearl Harbor
Battle of the Coral Sea
Battle of Midway
Battle of Guadalcanal
Operation Game Warden

Notes

References
 Wegener, Edward, Rear Admiral (rtd.), FRG, The Soviet naval offensive:An Examination of the Strategic Role of Soviet Naval Forces in the East-West Conflict., Naval Institute Press, Annapolis, 1975
  Hill Goodspeed, M., Burgess, Richard R., U.S. Naval Aviation, Naval Aviation Museum Foundation, Universe, 2001  
 Morison, Samuel Eliot, The Battle of the Atlantic: September 1939-May 1943 (History of United States Naval Operations in World War II, 1), Castle Books, 2001  
 Vego, Milan N., Naval Strategy and Operations in Narrow Seas, Cass Series – Naval Policy and History, Routledge, (2nd ed.), 2003 
 Menon,Raja, Rear Admiral, Maritime Strategy and Continental Wars, Cass Series – Naval Policy and History, Routledge, (1st ed.), 1998 
 Rose, Susan, Medieval Naval Warfare, 1000-1500 (Warfare and History), Routledge, (1st ed.), 2001 
 Lindberg, Michael, and Todd, Daniel, Brown-, Green- and Blue-Water Fleets: The Influence of Geography on Naval Warfare, 1861 to the Present, Praeger Publishers, 2001  
 Busuttil, James J., Naval Weapons Systems and the Contemporary Law of War (Oxford Monographs in International Law), Oxford University Press, USA, 1998 
 Massie, Robert K., Castles of Steel: Britain, Germany, and the Winning of the Great War at Sea, Ballantine Books, 2004 
 Abbot, Willis J.  and Jackson, Walter C., Blue Jackets Of 1812: A History Of The Naval Battles Of The Second War With Great Britain To Which Is Prefixed An Account Of The French War Of 1798, 1887, Kessinger Publishing, 2004 
 Strauss, Barry, The Battle of Salamis: The Naval Encounter That Saved Greece -- and Western Civilization, Simon & Schuster, 2004

Further reading

For use of carrier and land-based naval aviation in a naval offensive
 Hammel, Eric, Carrier Strike: The Battle of the Santa Cruz Islands,October 1942, Zenith Press, 2005 
 Konstam, Angus and Bryan, Tony, Confederate Submarines and Torpedo Vessels 1861-65 (New Vanguard), Osprey Publishing, 2004 

Military doctrines
Military strategy